Chalybea occidentalis is a species of plant in the family Melastomataceae. It is endemic to Cauca, and Risaralda in Colombia.

References

occidentalis
Vulnerable plants
Endemic flora of Colombia
Taxonomy articles created by Polbot